Aristides Pereira International Airport (Portuguese Aeroporto Internacional Aristides Pereira)  is an airport in Cape Verde located on the island of Boa Vista, about 5 km southeast of the island capital Sal Rei. It is the third-busiest airport in the country.

History
The conversion of the existing airport of Rabil into an international airport started in 2005, and was completed in 2007. The runway was extended from 1,200 to 2,100 metres length and from 30 to 45 metres width. The project cost 21 million euros. The airport was officially opened on 31 October 2007. The airport was originally named Rabil Airport, but on 19 November 2011 it was renamed as a tribute to the first president of Cape Verde, Aristides Pereira.

Airlines and destinations

<small> Flights from Boa Vista to Marrakech operate as round trips that start and end at Paris Orly Airport.

Statistics

See also
List of buildings and structures in Cape Verde
List of airports in Cape Verde

References

External links

Airports in Cape Verde
Boa Vista